Acacia frigescens, commonly known as montane wattle, frosted wattle or forest wattle is a shrub or tree of the genus Acacia and the subgenus Plurinerves. It is native to an area in south eastern Australia.<ref name=www>{{cite web|url=http://worldwidewattle.com/speciesgallery/frigescens.php|title=Acacia frigescens'''|accessdate=27 October 2020|work=World Wide Wattle|publisher=Western Australian Herbarium}}</ref>

Description
Like most species of Acacia it has phyllodes rather than true leaves.

Taxonomy
The species was first formally described by the botanist James Hamlyn Willis in 1957 as part of the work Vascular flora of Victoria and South Australia (sundry new species, varieties, combinations, records and synonymies) as published in the journal The Victorian Naturalist. It was reclassified as Racosperma frigescens in 2003 then transferred back to genus Acacia in 2006.

Distribution
It has a limited distribution in subalpine and montane areas in the east Gippsland region of Victoria from the north east of Melbourne to around Mount Coopracambra where it usually is part of the understorey in tall Eucalyptus forest communities often including Eucalyptus regnans''.

See also
 List of Acacia species

References

frigescens
Flora of Victoria (Australia)
Plants described in 1957
Taxa named by James Hamlyn Willis